In mathematics, the Littlewood subordination theorem, proved by J. E. Littlewood in 1925, is a theorem in operator theory and complex analysis. It states that any holomorphic univalent self-mapping of  the unit disk in the complex numbers that fixes 0 induces a contractive composition operator on various function spaces of holomorphic functions on the disk. These spaces include the Hardy spaces, the Bergman spaces and Dirichlet space.

Subordination theorem
Let h be a holomorphic univalent mapping of the unit disk D into itself such that h(0) = 0. Then the composition operator Ch defined on holomorphic functions f on D by

defines a linear operator with operator norm less than 1 on the Hardy spaces , the Bergman spaces .
(1 ≤ p < ∞) and the Dirichlet space .

The norms on these spaces are defined by:

Littlewood's inequalities
Let f be a holomorphic function on the unit disk D and let h be a holomorphic univalent mapping of D into itself with h(0) = 0. Then
if 0 < r < 1 and 1 ≤ p < ∞

This inequality also holds for 0 < p < 1, although in this case there is no operator interpretation.

Proofs

Case p = 2
To prove the result for H2 it suffices to show that for f a polynomial

Let U be the unilateral shift defined by

This has adjoint U* given by

Since f(0) = a0, this gives

and hence

Thus

Since U*f has degree less than f, it follows by induction that

and hence

The same method of proof works for A2 and

General Hardy spaces
If f is in Hardy space Hp, then it has a factorization

with fi an inner function and fo an outer function.

Then

Inequalities
Taking 0 < r < 1, Littlewood's inequalities follow by applying the Hardy space inequalities to the function

The inequalities can also be deduced, following , using subharmonic functions. The inequaties in turn immediately imply the subordination theorem for general Bergman spaces.

Notes

References

Operator theory
Theorems in complex analysis